Islandiana is a genus of dwarf spiders that was first described by J. Braendegaard in 1932.

Species
 it contains fifteen species, found in Canada, Greenland, Iceland, Russia, and the United States:
Islandiana cavealis Ivie, 1965 – USA
Islandiana coconino Ivie, 1965 – USA
Islandiana cristata Eskov, 1987 – Russia (Europe to Far East), USA (Alaska), Canada
Islandiana falsifica (Keyserling, 1886) (type) – North America, Northern Europe, Russia (Europe to Far East)
Islandiana flaveola (Banks, 1892) – USA, Canada
Islandiana flavoides Ivie, 1965 – USA
Islandiana holmi Ivie, 1965 – USA
Islandiana lasalana (Chamberlin & Ivie, 1935) – USA
Islandiana lewisi Milne & Wells, 2018 – USA
Islandiana longisetosa (Emerton, 1882) – USA, Canada
Islandiana mimbres Ivie, 1965 – USA
Islandiana muma Ivie, 1965 – USA
Islandiana princeps Braendegaard, 1932 – USA, Canada, Greenland, Iceland
Islandiana speophila Ivie, 1965 – USA
Islandiana unicornis Ivie, 1965 – USA

See also
 List of Linyphiidae species (I–P)

References

Araneomorphae genera
Holarctic spiders
Linyphiidae
Spiders of North America